Megathymus streckeri, or Strecker's giant skipper, is butterfly of the family Hesperiidae. It is found in the United States from southeastern Montana and southwestern North Dakota south to southern Texas and west to northwestern Arizona and southwestern Utah. Its habitats include short grass prairies, sand hills, and rocky bluffs.

The wingspan is 57–78 mm. The forewings are wide. The upperside is black, the forewing has white spots near the tip and a yellow band, while the hindwing has a white to yellow marginal band and long hairlike scales. The underside of the hindwings is gray or mottled gray and black, and has several white spots. Adults are on wing from May to July in one generation. Adults males sip moisture from mud.

The larvae feed on Yucca glauca, Yucca constricta, Yucca angustissima and Yucca baileyi. Young larvae burrow into the stem of the host plant toward the root. After hibernating in the burrow, the larvae surface through the stem or soil and construct a tent of silk, soil and plant debris in which pupation takes place.

References

Megathyminae
Butterflies described in 1895
Butterflies of North America